Dict Robert was a 50-foot waterline length trimaran that was sailed across the Atlantic ocean in 1981.

See also
 List of multihulls

References

Trimarans
1980s sailing yachts